is a single-member electoral district of the House of Representatives the lower house of the Diet of Japan. The district is in Kagoshima Prefecture and covers most of the prefectural capital the city of Kagoshima (a small part of the city is in the Kagoshima 2nd district) and includes Kagoshima District which covers several small islands south of Kyushu. In of 2021 the district had 358,559 eligible voters.

The district was created following the 1994 Japanese electoral reform. From the first elections in 1996 until 2009, the Representative was Okiharu Yasuoka who was first elected to the Diet in 1972 and was for a long time a Representative for an electoral district that covered the Amami Islands.

In the DPJ victory in the 2009 elections the district was won by democrat Hiroshi Kawauchi, but Yasuoka won the district back in 2012.

Yasuoka retired for health reasons in 2017 and his son Hirotake Yasuoka ran for his seat in 2017 but lost to Kawauchi. In 2021 Hirotake Yasuoka was put on a safe spot in the Kyushu proportional representation block, where he gained a seat in the Diet, and was replaced by Takuma Miyaji as the LDP candidate. Miyaji won the seat back in the 2021 election. Miyaji is the son of Kazuaki Miyaji, former Representative of the Kagoshima 3rd district and had first gained seat in the Diet in 2017 in the Kyushu PR block.

List of representatives

Election results

References 

Kagoshima Prefecture
Districts of the House of Representatives (Japan)